Tomáš Matykiewicz (born 4 December 1982) is a Czech weightlifter. He competed in the men's heavyweight event at the 2004 Summer Olympics. He was tested positive for doping after the 2007 World Weightlifting Championships and was banned from competing for two years.

References

External links
 

1982 births
Living people
Czech male weightlifters
Olympic weightlifters of the Czech Republic
Weightlifters at the 2004 Summer Olympics
People from Český Těšín
Czech sportspeople in doping cases
Doping cases in weightlifting
Sportspeople from the Moravian-Silesian Region